Telemba is a fresh water body in the Yeravninsky District, Buryatia, Russia. Telemba village is located on the western shore of the lake.

There is a military training ground of the Eastern Military District of the Russian Armed Forces near the lake.

Geography
Telemba lake is located in the Vitim Plateau. The Konda River, a tributary of the Vitim River, flows to the east and southeast of the lakeshores. There are other lakes nearby, but Telemba is the largest and most picturesque of the lakes of the Konda river basin.

See also
List of lakes of Russia

References

External links
- Fishing in Telemba lake (in Russian)
Geography of tourism in the Republic of Buryatia
Lakes of Buryatia
ceb:Ozero Telemba